The Military ranks of the Kingdom of Bulgaria were the military insignia used by the Kingdom of Bulgaria. Following the abolition of the monarchy, the ranks were also changed.

Commissioned officer ranks 
The rank insignia of commissioned officers.

Other ranks 
The rank insignia of non-commissioned officers and enlisted personnel.

References 
Citations

Bibliography

External links 
 

Bulgaria, Kingdom
Military of Bulgaria